Montefiorino is a comune (municipality) in the Province of Modena in the Italian region Emilia-Romagna, located about  southwest of Bologna and about  southwest of Modena.

Twin towns
 Carqueiranne, France

References

See also
 Bibulca Way

Cities and towns in Emilia-Romagna
Castles in Italy